Breymann is a surname.

Notable people with this surname include:
 Adolf Breymann (1839-1878), German sculptor
 Heinrich von Breymann (died 1777), German soldier
 Henriette Schrader-Breymann (1827–1899), German educator
 Hermann Breymann (1842-1910), German philologist
 Susanne Rode-Breymann (born 1958), German musicologist